San Giorgio is a Genoa Metro station in Genoa, Italy. It is located under Piazza della Raibetta beside the Palazzo San Giorgio, after which it is named. It is in the Old Harbour area near the Aquarium of Genoa.

The station was designed by architects Renzo Piano BWS ndm.

References

Genoa Metro stations
Railway stations opened in 2003
2003 establishments in Italy
Railway stations in Italy opened in the 21st century